Kinston Apartments is a historic apartment complex located in Kinston, Lenoir County, North Carolina. It was built about 1940, and is a five building Colonial Revival style brick-faced complex, with the buildings positioned in a "U"-shape.  The buildings are two-story, with full basements, and have Moderne style decorative elements.  Three of the buildings have four apartment units, with two having two three-bedroom apartments.  The buildings were renovated in 2003. It is locally referred to as Kinston Oaks.

It was listed on the National Register of Historic Places in 2004.

References

Residential buildings on the National Register of Historic Places in North Carolina
Colonial Revival architecture in North Carolina
Streamline Moderne architecture in the United States
Residential buildings completed in 1940
Buildings and structures in Lenoir County, North Carolina
National Register of Historic Places in Lenoir County, North Carolina